Jarhead is a 2003 Gulf War memoir by author and former U.S. Marine Anthony Swofford. After leaving military service, the author went on to college and earned a double master's degree in Fine Arts at the University of Iowa.

Plot
Jarhead recounts Swofford's enlistment and service in the United States Marine Corps during the Persian Gulf War, in which he served as a Scout Sniper Trainee with the Surveillance and Target Acquisition (STA) Platoon of 2nd Battalion, 7th Marines.

Like most of the troops stationed in the Middle East during the Gulf War, Swofford saw very little actual combat. Swofford's narrative focuses on the physical, mental and emotional struggles of the young Marines.

One of the through lines of his first-person account involves the challenge of balancing the art and science and mind-set of the warrior with one's own basic sense of humanity. Swofford admits to a sense of disappointment, frustration and emptiness that comes in the wake of ultimately being cheated of any real combat experience by a war that, for many American Marines at least, has ended all too quickly after enduring many months of grinding, anticlimactic suspense. And yet there have been the numerous encounters with poignant, eerie tableaux of dead Iraqi soldiers who'd been killed so quickly where they sat so as to appear to have been deliberately posed, like store-display mannequins, in their final moments of life.

Film adaptations 
The novel was adapted into a 2005 feature film of the same name starring Jake Gyllenhaal, Jamie Foxx, and Peter Sarsgaard. The screenplay was written by William Broyles Jr. and directed by Sam Mendes. Reviews were generally positive. Jarhead 2: Field of Fire is the sequel to the 2005 film, followed by Jarhead 3: The Siege.

References

2003 non-fiction books
Memoirs adapted into films
Charles Scribner's Sons books
Gulf War books
Military memoirs
Non-fiction books about the United States Marine Corps